The Standards of Weights, Measures, and Coinage Act 1866 was an Act of the Parliament of the United Kingdom of Great Britain and Ireland.

Details
The act created a department of the Board of Trade called the Standard Weights and Measures Department. This department was responsible for maintaining the weights and measures used in the country – in particular, the primary and secondary standards, the physical "master" weights and lengths that other measuring devices could be compared against. These had previously been the responsibility of the Exchequer.

Notes

References
 
 

United Kingdom Acts of Parliament 1866